Rouzbahan Raed A Fraij (born 7 April 2000), known as Rouzbahan Fraij, is a Jordanian footballer who plays as a defender for local Women's League club Shabab Al-Ordon and the Jordan women's national team.

International goals

References

External links

2000 births
Living people
Jordanian women's footballers
Jordan women's international footballers
Women's association football defenders
Sportspeople from Amman
Jordan Women's Football League players
21st-century Jordanian women